J. Page Hayden Field is a baseball venue in Cincinnati, Ohio, United States.  It is home to the Xavier Musketeers baseball team of the NCAA Division I Big East.  Since 2006, the Cincinnati Steam of the collegiate summer Great Lakes Summer Collegiate League have also used Hayden Field.  The facility was dedicated in 1982 for J. Page Hayden, under whose name a donation for the field's renovation was made.  It has a capacity of 500 spectators.

History 
Xavier began playing at the location in the 1920s.  In 1935, the field's dimensions were adjusted with the construction of the O'Connor Sports Center beyond the right center field fence.  The field was renovated again in 1982 because of a donation made under the name of J. Page Hayden (1898–1979), the field's namesake.  Following the 2010 season, a new playing surface, brick backstop, and dugouts were added.

From 1980–2013, Xavier baseball has a 450-307-3 overall record at the field.

See also
 List of NCAA Division I baseball venues

References

External links 
J. Page Hayden Field photo gallery at goxavier.com
2010 Renovations photo gallery at goxavier.com
Photo gallery field review at StadiumJourney.com

College baseball venues in the United States
Baseball venues in Ohio
Xavier Musketeers baseball
1920s establishments in Ohio
Sports venues completed in the 1920s